Rajendracholiswarar Temple, Ilaiyankudi, is a Siva temple in Ilaiyankudi in Ramanathapuram District in Tamil Nadu (India). This place is also known as Indira Avathara Nallur.

Vaippu Sthalam
It is one of the shrines of the Vaippu Sthalams sung by Tamil Saivite Nayanar Sundarar.

Presiding deity
The presiding deity in the garbhagriha, represented by the lingam, is known as Rajendracholiswarar. His consort is known as Gnanambikai. There is a separate shrine for Ilaiyankudi Mara Nayanar. This is the birth place of the Ilayankudi Maranar. Temple tree of this temple is vilva. Temple tirtta is known as Deiva Pushkarani.

Festivals
Maha Shivaratri, Kanda Sasti and Karthikai festivals are held in this temple. The temple is opened for worship from 6.00 to 11.00 a.m. and 4.30 to 8.30 p.m.

Location
It is situated in Madurai-Ramanathapuram road, next to Paramakudi, Emaneswaram, Kumarakurichi and Tiruvudayarpuram. The temple is located at Maranayanar street in Ilaiyankudi.

References

Hindu temples in Ramanathapuram district